Bielby is a village and civil parish in the East Riding of Yorkshire, England.

According to the 2011 UK census, Bielby parish had a population of 258, a decrease on the 2001 UK census figure of 281.

About two miles north-east of Bielby, on the edge of Hayton, lie the ruins of an ancient Roman military fortress, an important archaeological site. The University of Durham, Dept of Archaeology, led an excavation between 1995 and 1998 with assistance from local residents and University of Leeds students. A well, a bath-house and many other parts of the Roman fortress have been identified.

The name Bielby, spelled Belebi in the Domesday Book, derives from the Old Scandinavian personal name Beli, and means "farmstead or village of a man called Beli." The total rent collected from tenants in Bielby dropped from 1066 to 1086 from £56 to £8. By the 11th century Bielebi (Bielby) had almost 10 residents.

One home in Bielby is proudly named Bielbyville. Most homes in Bielby have a name plate sign displayed either on the front exterior wall or in the yard (even though the homes are modest in size). Another House at the end of the village is Manor Cottage where many a farmers worked on land next to the house (although since 2009 been empty).

Bielby has an Anglican church (St. Giles), which dates back more than 900 years. The Methodist revival which swept England in the 18th century still has a visible presence in Bielby, although the old Methodist Church building in the village is now a private residence.

History

The Great Heathen Army of the Vikings captured much of the area in 866, and, in 876, their remnants settled permanently in parts of the Yorkshire countryside. The Great Heathen Army marched directly through the section Bielby would be established near in 865, conquering what would become York in 866. Viking kings ruled the whole region around Bielby, known to historians as "The Viking Kingdom of Jorvik", for almost a century. In 954, the last Viking king, Eric Bloodaxe, was expelled and his kingdom was incorporated in the newly consolidated Anglo-Saxon state.

Notable people from Bielby
 John Smith (1807–1895), of Bielby, was a maker of sundials and "a remarkable man in his way".

People named Bielby
Until recently, residents named Bielby lived in the village. The last Bielby was an Alice Bielby who formerly taught in the village school during the middle 20th century. (source: A Bielby village bearer of the key for St. Giles Church in 2001)  There are no known Bielbys left in the village.

Some Bielby's have their names spelled Beilby or Beelby on different documents. 
There are people bearing the name Bielby or Beilby living across England, Canada, the US, Australia, New Zealand, South Africa and elsewhere. Some Bielbys who spread throughout England became famous for their glass-blowing skill. The Beilby goblets boast the highest auction prices of any King's goblets sold in markets in recent history. Rev. Beilby Porteus was a well-known preacher and author who was Bishop of London from 1787 until his death in 1809.

Some of the Bielbys in Canada and America have known forefathers who were Methodist (see the John Bielby family and descendants from Lake City, Michigan, immigrating from Ontario to Michigan in about 1900. Also his grandfather, Richard Milson Bielby, was a noted Holiness Church member in Huntsville, Ontario during the last half of the 19th century) He is mentioned in Methodist articles from that time period as a significant lay member of their movement. Traces of Methodist influence from England into America via the Bielbys exist primarily in Canada. Other than St. Giles Church, the old Methodist Church-which is now a home, no other religious organizations were represented in Bielby.

Bielbys who were multi-generational pioneers of Ontario, Canada: Richard Bielby (1774 to 1835) migrated with some of his family from Weaverthorpe, Yorkshire, England to York, Ontario, Canada. His son, Richard Milson Bielby (1809 to 1882) was also born in Weaverthorpe, Yorkshire, England and died in Ontario Canada. He was a noted Wesleyan lay leader in Ontario. His son Richard O. Bielby (1834 to 1899) was born and died in Ontario. Then Richard Matthew Bielby (1860 to 1943) was a pioneer of Missaukee County, Michigan, United States. This Richard Bielby was the first railroad engineer in the county, hauling freshly cut timber from the developing county to nearby Traverse City, Michigan in an early model steam engine (1890s). This same Richard Matthew Bielby was the local bank President, Sheriff and owned and operated a local Hardware Store in Lake City, Michigan. His family also helped found the first Presbyterian Church in Lake City, Michigan. Richard Matthew Bielbys brother, John H Bielby followed him down to Lake City, Michigan, United States from Ontario, Canada years later. Married Richard Matthew Bielby's wife (Jennie White) sister, Alice White. The White sisters were some of the very first pioneers in Missaukee County. Jennie was "the first white baby" to arrive in the county. So all of the descendants of these two Bielbys are double cousins. The descendants of these four Richard Bielbys (and their siblings) represent most of the Bielbys living in North America today. Another interesting wrinkle in this history, is that the White sisters were the daughters of a direct descendant of a passenger on the Mayflower's very first voyage to America. Thus making all of the Bielbys who descend from the double cousin Bielbys of Lake City direct descendants of 1620 Mayflower passengers who settled in Plymouth Rock, Massachusetts Bay Colony!

These multi-generation Bielby pioneers represent most of the Bielbys living in North America (Many provinces of Canada & and many states in the United States) alive in the early 21st Century.

In addition to St. Giles, The College Arms (a small pub serving lunch and dinner), Bielby is mostly residential, with a few newer homes. Geese are still raised on the edge of the village. The Pocklington Canal still provides a splendid water supply for such purposes. A Beck also runs close to Bielby and used to drive an old flour Mill, but from time to time it can flood, as it did in June 2007, overflowing the streets of Bielby up to the doorsteps of some homes.

Karl Pearson's grandmother was named Bielby. She lived in Crambe and other places near Bielby.

Church restoration

The parish church of St Giles has recently been restored. Plaster has been removed and sandstone walls restored. Two arches on the outside of the church, and a pillar and skeleton on an inside wall, have been uncovered. Removal of the external rendering has uncovered a history of the church, with pillars and arches now visible that would have been part of a larger structure. Inside, an ancient blue-coloured painting was revealed, showing the legs of St Christopher. The plasterwork had deteriorated to such an extent that when efforts were made to protect it, it crumbled off the wall in fragments. The box pews are among the best-preserved in the East Riding of Yorkshire.

The church was designated a Grade II* listed building in January 1967 and is now recorded in the National Heritage List for England, maintained by Historic England.

References

External links

Villages in the East Riding of Yorkshire
Civil parishes in the East Riding of Yorkshire